Ana Luiza Busato Barbachan (born 15 August 1989 in Porto Alegre) is a Brazilian sports sailor. She was chosen by Olympic medalist Fernanda Oliveira to be her new partner in the 470 class after Oliveira's 2009 split with Isabel Swan. Barbachan has since competed with Oliveira at two Olympic Games, London 2012 (finishing 6th) and Rio 2016 (finishing 8th).

She represented Brazil at the 2020 Summer Olympics.

References

External links
 
 
 
 
  

1989 births
Living people
Brazilian female sailors (sport)
Olympic sailors of Brazil
Sailors at the 2012 Summer Olympics – 470
Sailors at the 2016 Summer Olympics – 470
Sailors at the 2020 Summer Olympics – 470
Sportspeople from Porto Alegre